Jo Henri Frappier (August 8, 1931 - January 23, 2019) was an American politician who served in the Missouri Senate and the Missouri House of Representatives. He served in the U.S. Army as a sergeant in the U.S. Marine Corps during the Korean War from 1951 to 1953.  Frappier was previously elected to the Missouri House of Representatives in 1966, serving until 1974 and four years as chairman of the House Minority Caucus. His wife M. Joyce Frappier died in 1986. Mr. Frappier had been working as the Missouri director of governmental operations and legislation at the time of her death. In 1989, he married Nancy Jo McIntyre in Jefferson City, Missouri. McIntyre had been a reporter for United Press International.

References

1931 births
2019 deaths
Politicians from Milwaukee
Indiana University alumni
United States Marine Corps personnel of the Korean War
Republican Party members of the Missouri House of Representatives
Republican Party Missouri state senators